OP ruft Dr. Bruckner is a television series that airs in Germany.

See also
List of German television series

External links
 

1996 German television series debuts
1999 German television series endings
German medical television series
Television shows set in Berlin
German-language television shows
RTL (German TV channel) original programming